Telugu Nadu Trade Union Council (TNTUC) is the trade union wing of the Telugu Desam Party.

References

Trade unions in India
Trade unions in Telangana
Trade unions in Andhra Pradesh
Telugu Desam Party
Year of establishment missing